Bonari-ye Sofla (also Romanized as Bonārī-ye Soflá; also known as Banārī-ye Pā’īn, Benārī-ye Pa’īn, Bonārī, and Bonārī-ye Pā’īn) is a village in Charam Rural District, in the Central District of Charam County, Kohgiluyeh and Boyer-Ahmad Province, Iran. At the 2006 census, its population was 309, in 64 families.

References 

Populated places in Charam County